Somaya Saeed Said Fetiha El Khashab (born on 20 October 1976) is an Egyptian actress and Khaliji singer. She began her career in 1998, acting in many series and movies, and became one of the most famous actresses in Egypt, winning many awards. She also became a khaliji singer in 2009 after releasing her first album Hayessal eh.

Career
Somaya El Khashab graduated from Faculty of Commerce in Alexandria University in 1997. She begun her career in 1998, her first work was in Earth secret TV series in 1998. her most famous roles in TV series was in Alhaj Metwali family in 2001 with Nour El-Sherif, The truth and The illusion in 2003 with Fifi Abdou and Yousuf Shaaban, Raya and Sakina in 2005 with Abla Kamel, Interview on life with Yousra and Hesham Selim, Mahmood Almasri with Mahmoud Abdel Aziz, The Satan Gardens in 2006 with Jamal Suliman, Kayd elnesa in 2009, Kings valley in 2011, Wind inherit in 2013, Alhalal in 2017.
her most famous roles in movies was in Randeefo in 2001 with Kal Naga, Mediterranean man in 2001, I love you, me to in 2003 with Mostafa Qamar, Honor day in 2004 with Ahmed Ezz, The Yacoubian Building with Adel Emam and Hend Sabry, Justified treason in 2006 with Hany Salama and May Ez El deen. She also begun her career in music in 2009 after releasing her album Hayessal eh, she make many music video with Yehia Saada and Rindala Kodeih. She released her last song in 2019 with Jamil Almaghazi. She won many awards from her works, she won Murex d'Or award from Lebanon in 2009 as best Arab actress. She also won ART award from Arab Radio and Television Network in 2013 as best actress for her role in Wind inherit TV series. She was honored in Saudi Arabia after releasing her song “Btstaawa” where she tackled violence against women.

Personal life
She announced that she married four times secretly. In 2017, she married Egyptian khaliji singer Ahmed Saad, they divorced shortly in March 2019. She accused Ahmed Saad of domestic abuse during a TV interview with Basma Wehbe.

Works

TV Series

Movies

Stage

Albums

Music videos

References

External links
 

1976 births
Living people
21st-century Egyptian actresses
Egyptian film actresses
Egyptian television actresses
21st-century Egyptian women singers
People from Alexandria
Alexandria University alumni